Ruth (or its variants) may refer to:

Places

France
 Château de Ruthie, castle in the commune of Aussurucq in the Pyrénées-Atlantiques département of France

Switzerland
 Ruth, a hamlet in Cologny

United States
 Ruth, Alabama
 Ruth, Arkansas
 Ruth, California
 Ruth, Louisiana
 Ruth, Pulaski County, Kentucky
 Ruth, Michigan
 Ruth, Mississippi
 Ruth, Nevada
 Ruth, North Carolina
 Ruth, Virginia
 Ruth, Washington
 Ruth, West Virginia

In space
 Ruth (lunar crater), crater on the Moon
 Ruth (Venusian crater), crater on Venus
 798 Ruth, asteroid

People
 Ruth (biblical figure) 
 Ruth (given name) contains list of namesakes including fictional
 Princess Ruth or Keʻelikōlani, (1826–1883), Hawaiian princess

Surname
 A. S. Ruth, American politician
 Babe Ruth (1895–1948), American baseball player
 Connie Ruth, American politician
 Earl B. Ruth (1916–1989), American politician
 Elizabeth Ruth, Canadian novelist
 Kristin Ruth, American judge
 Nancy Ruth, Canadian politician
 Hampton Del Ruth (1879-1958), American film actor and producer
 Roy Del Ruth (1893−1961), American film director
 Thomas Del Ruth (born 1942), American cinematographer

Code name
 Ruth, code name of Pridi Banomyong, former Prime Minister and leader of the Thai underground against the Japanese occupation during World War II

Art, entertainment, and media

Films
 Citizen Ruth (1996), a movie about abortion in the United States

Literature
 Ruth (novel), an 1853 novel by Elizabeth Gaskell
 The Book of Ruth (novel), a 1988 novel by Jane Hamilton

Music
 Ruth (band), American band out of Vancouver, Washington
 Ruth Ruth, American pop punk band
 Ruth (album), by American indie folk group Nana Grizol (2010)

Television
Ruthie on the Telephone, a series aired on the CBS Television network during 1949
 "Ruthie" (BoJack Horseman)

Bible
 Book of Ruth, a book of the Hebrew Bible/Old Testament

Brands and enterprises
 Baby Ruth, candy bar
 Ruth–Aaron pair, two consecutive integers for which the sums of the prime factors of each integer are equal
 Ruth's Chris Steak House, an American restaurant chain

Other uses 
 Typhoon Ruth, name of several tropical cyclones worldwide
 Rolandas Kalinauskas RK-5 Ruth, a Lithuanian light aircraft design
 Ruth, one of the unsuccessful tests of the Uranium hydride bomb

See also
 Ruth Island, artificial island off Saint Croix, U.S. Virgin Islands
 Ruth Lake (disambiguation)